Kabatiella caulivora is fungus in the family Saccotheciaceae. It is a plant pathogen infecting red clover.

References

Fungal plant pathogens and diseases
Dothideales
Fungi described in 1902